Carlos Villar Turrau (born December 22, 1945 in San Sebastián) was a general and Chief of Staff of the Army (Spain) and General of the Army (Spain) from 28 April 2006 to 18 July 2008.

References

1945 births
Living people
People from San Sebastián
Spanish military officers